Makogonov is a Slavic masculine surname, its feminine counterpart is Makogonova. Notable people with the surname include:

Irina Makogonova (born 1959), Russian volleyball player
Vladimir Makogonov (1904–1993), Azerbaijani chess player 

Russian-language surnames